Charles McCoy may refer to:

 Charlie McCoy (born 1941), American harmonica player
 Papa Charlie McCoy (1909–1950), American blues musician
 Charlie McCoy (cyclist) (born 1937), British Olympic cyclist
 C. J. McCoy, American football and basketball coach
 Kid McCoy (1872–1940), American boxer
Charlie McCoy  (model) American male model